Obsidian Fate is an original novel based on the U.S. television series Buffy the Vampire Slayer.

Description

A five-hundred-year-old Spanish expedition has been located on the outskirts of Sunnydale. There's a mysterious mirror which is purported to have contained the spirit of Tezcatlipoca that has been uncovered... Only to be lost immediately under very odd circumstances. As Buffy begins to investigate the odd occurrence she finds herself in a fight with a large jaguar that has appeared out of nowhere. Buffy's also starting to have dreams about ancient Aztec temples as well as some very disturbing things regarding Angel. As she and the Scoobies begin to dig deeper into the mystery they realize that Tezcatlipoca's spirit, once released on the world, could very well stop the sun from shining ever again.

Continuity

Supposed to be set in the middle of season 3 of Buffy.

Canonical issues

Buffy novels such as this one are not usually considered by fans as canonical. Some fans consider them stories from the imaginations of authors and artists, while other fans consider them as taking place in an alternative fictional reality. However unlike fan fiction, overviews summarising their story, written early in the writing process, were 'approved' by both Fox and Joss Whedon (or his office), and the books were therefore later published as officially Buffy merchandise.

External links
Websites.cable.ntl.com - Watcher's Web interview about Buffy novels in general, Obsidian Fate and Prime Evil

Reviews
Litefoot1969.bravepages.com - Review of this book by Litefoot
Nika-summers.com - Review of this book by Nika Summers
Shadowcat.name - Review of this book

1999 novels
Books based on Buffy the Vampire Slayer